Isabella Linton is a fictional character in Emily Brontë's 1847 novel Wuthering Heights.  She is the sister of Edgar Linton and the wife of Heathcliff.

Story 
Isabella Linton was raised in the safe, elegant environment of Thrushcross Grange with her brother, Edgar. When Catherine Earnshaw of Wuthering Heights suffers an accident while intruding on the Grange, the Lintons take her in and transform her into a lady in five weeks and return with no sign of mischief being a part of her.

When Heathcliff returns to the neighbourhood to exact revenge on the Lintons for Edgar's marriage to his true love Catherine, Isabella is irresistibly attracted to him.  Catherine is deeply shocked by this, and playfully tells Heathcliff, enabling him to see a route to vengeance.  Isabella, hurt by Catherine's betrayal, grows cold and distant to everyone around her, and, with everyone opposing a relationship with Heathcliff, "moped around in the garden" in great distress.  Even more nervous is Edgar, who is suspicious of Heathcliff's mysterious return to the neighbourhood, but does not know what to do about it.  It becomes apparent that Heathcliff is seducing Isabella when he "embraces her", much to Catherine's dislike.  In explanation, Heathcliff reveals to her that he "will have his vengeance", and that he does not love Isabella: if Catherine wished him to marry her, he, "would cut his throat."

One night, it is revealed to Nelly Dean, a servant at Wuthering Heights and the primary narrator of the novel, that Isabella has run off with Heathcliff, although Edgar has warned her that, if she does so, he will cut off all ties with her.  After several months, Heathcliff and Isabella marry, but she soon realises her mistake, sending a long letter to Nelly in which she details her hostile and displeasing "welcome" at the Heights and her hatred for Heathcliff, who has made it clear that he has married her only because he is now the heir to the Grange.  Isabella is reduced to the status of the abused, hurt and degraded wife, and Nelly describes Heathcliff as looking like "the only one decent" in the household, while Isabella has seemingly lost the title of Miss Linton of Thrushcross Grange.

Isabella grows to despise her vengeful, tyrannical husband. After Catherine dies, Isabella taunts Heathcliff by insisting that Cathy's death was entirely his fault. She also points out that Hindley Earnshaw, Catherine's brother and Heathcliff's greatest enemy, has the same eyes as her, despite Heathcliff's relentless attempts to "gouge them out".  This provokes Heathcliff to a deep and passionate anger, which results in yet another brawl between himself and Hindley.  Seeing it as a chance to flee, Isabella escapes Wuthering Heights and her disastrous, terrifying marriage once and for all.  She describes the occurrence thus:

The back of the settle and Earnshaw's person interposed between me and him; so instead of endeavouring to reach me, he snatched a dinner-knife from the table and flung it at my head.  It struck beneath my ear, and stopped the sentence I was uttering; but, pulling it out, I sprang to the door and delivered another; which I hope went a little deeper than his missile.  The last glimpse I caught of him was a furious rush on his part, checked by the embrace of his host; and both fell locked together on the hearth.  In my flight through the kitchen I bid Joseph speed to his master; I knocked over Hareton, who was hanging a litter of puppies from a chair-back in the doorway; and, blessed as a soul escaped from purgatory, I bounded, leaped, and flew down the steep road; then, quitting its windings, shot direct across the moor, rolling over banks, and wading through marshes: precipitating myself, in fact, towards the beacon-light of the Grange.  And far rather would I be condemned to a perpetual dwelling in the infernal regions than, even for one night, abide beneath the roof of Wuthering Heights again.

After informing Nelly of how she pursued her escape, and paying one last visit to Thrushcross Grange, her childhood home, Isabella removes somewhere "south of London", where she gives birth to Heathcliff's son, Linton, who resembles Isabella in every aspect.  The two lead a peaceful life for thirteen years, although no detail is given as to their activities.  Edgar visits Isabella in her final illness, where she asks him to take charge of Linton, and raise him away from his father.

Description 
Isabella inherits the blonde hair, blue eyes, and pale skin of the Linton family.  Her son, Linton Heathcliff, also inherits these features.  She is witty, sensitive, temperamental, and shallow.  In the words of Nelly, Isabella "has a capacity for strong attachments", as shown in her falling hopelessly in love with Heathcliff, who in turn takes advantage of her blind affections, leading them both into their tormenting marriage.

Reception 
The character has been analyzed in the context of portrayal of domestic violence and coverture in literature.

Further reading

References

Characters in Wuthering Heights